Clematis serratifolia, the Korean clematis, is a species of flowering plant in the family Ranunculaceae, native to Khabarovsk and Primorsky Krais of the Russian Far East, Manchuria, and the Korean Peninsula.
A deciduous climber reaching , in the wild it is often found growing in calcareous soils, but can handle acidic soil as well. As an ornamental it is grown for its citrus-like floral aroma and its fluffy seedheads, and is recommended for courtyards, walls, borders, and the like.

References

serratifolia
Garden plants of Asia
Flora of Khabarovsk Krai
Flora of Primorsky Krai
Flora of Manchuria
Flora of Korea
Plants described in 1910